Mill Brook is a river in Chenango County, New York. It flows into Unadilla River north of New Berlin.

References

Rivers of New York (state)
Rivers of Chenango County, New York